Chadi Cheikh Merai (born 20 January 1976 in Latakia, Syria), also known as Chadi, is a Syrian football player who is currently playing for Pietrasanta Marina in the regional Eccellenza football division for clubs in Tuscany, Italy.  He is currently the manager of the same team.

He played for Massese and Lucchese in the third highest football league in Italy. He has an Italian passport, too.

Career

Player

Club 
Cheick Merai started his career at Teshrin club in Latakia, Syria.
He went to Italy on 1999 and he started his Italian senior career on Serie D, the top level of the Italian non-professional football association.
In the season 2001–2002 he played his first match on Serie C2, the fourth highest football league in Italy, the first with a professional status. Chadi so is the first Syrian footballer playing in an Italian professional team.
In the season 2002–2003 Chadi scored two goals against Fiorentina.
In the season 2005–2006 he reached Serie C1, the third highest Italian football league.
As a player for Carrarese he played the last professional championship in the season 2011–2012.

Syrian national team 

Chadi was part of the Syrian national team between 1996 and 1998. He holds 7 caps.

Coaching

Club 
In August 2012 Pietrasanta Marina announced on their official website that Chadi signed a deal with the club.

Honours

Player

Club 
Teshrin
Syrian Premier League: 1996/97
U.S. Poggibonsi
Serie D winner: 2000/01
Massese
Serie D winner: 2003/04
Serie C2 winner: 2004/05
Lucchese
Serie D winner: 2008/09
Lega Pro Seconda Divisione winner: 2009/10
Carrarese
Lega Pro Seconda Divisione winner: 2010/11

Syrian national team 
AFC Youth Championship: Runners-up 1996

References

External links
 

1976 births
Living people
People from Latakia
Association football forwards
Syrian footballers
Syria international footballers
Syrian expatriate footballers
Expatriate footballers in Italy
Tishreen SC players
Italian football managers
Syrian football managers
Syrian Premier League players